John Tanner was an Anglican bishop in the early 17th century.

A Cornishman, he was consecrated Bishop of Derry in May 1613 and died in post on 14 October 1615

References

People from Cornwall
17th-century Anglican bishops in Ireland
Bishops of Derry
1615 deaths